Iodine trifluoride is an interhalogen compound with the chemical formula IF3. It is a yellow solid which decomposes above −28 °C.  It can be synthesised from the elements, but care must be taken to avoid the formation of IF5.

Reactions
F2 reacts with I2 to yield IF3 at −45 °C in CCl3F.  Alternatively, at low temperatures, the fluorination reaction I2 + 3XeF2 → 2IF3 + 3Xe can be used.  Not much is known about iodine trifluoride as it is so unstable.

Structure
The iodine atom of iodine trifluoride has five electron pairs, of which two are lone-pairs, and the molecule is T-shaped  as predicted by VSEPR Theory.

References

Fluorides
Interhalogen compounds
Iodine compounds